Andrew Harper (1844-1936) was a Scottish–Australian biblical scholar, teacher, and school principal.

Andrew Harper may also refer to:

 Andrew Harper, pseudonym of Douglas Clegg (born 1958), American horror and dark fantasy author
 Andrew John Harper (born 1971), Australian fraudster
 Andy Harper (born 1967), Australian soccer player
 Killing of Andrew Harper, the death of a British police officer in the line of duty